Denis Aleksandrovich Skorokhodov (born 23 September 1981) is a former Russian professional footballer.

Club career
He played 10 seasons in the Russian Football National League for FC Sibir Novosibirsk and FC KAMAZ Naberezhnye Chelny.

References

External links
 

1981 births
Footballers from Moscow
Living people
Russian footballers
Association football midfielders
FC Torpedo Moscow players
FC Torpedo-2 players
FC Sibir Novosibirsk players
FC KAMAZ Naberezhnye Chelny players
FC Dynamo Barnaul players